The Airbus Helicopters VSR700 in an unmanned reconnaissance helicopter currently being developed by Airbus Helicopters (formerly Eurocopter).

Design and development
Developed by Airbus, the VSR700 is based on the Cabri G2 light helicopter, developed and produced by Hélicoptères Guimbal. Airbus was awarded a contract by the French Navy toward the end of 2017.

The drone is designed to eventually deploy from Mistral-class amphibious assault ship, as well as from frigates.

The prototype VSR700 performed its first flight at a drone test centre near Aix-en-Provence, France, on 8 November 2019.

Specifications

See also

References

External links
 Airbus Helicopters VSR700 backgrounder

VSR700
Unmanned helicopters
Unmanned military aircraft of France
Airborne military robots
2010s French helicopters